Petros 'Pedro' Regas  (born Panagiotis Thomas Regakos; April 18, 1897 – August 10, 1974 in Hollywood, Los Angeles), a veteran stage actor, Regas was spotted on the Broadway stage by Mary Pickford who persuaded him to go to Hollywood and be in pictures, which he did in 1920 and continued to play in films for 50 years.

Regas died of a heart attack and was interred in the Hollywood Forever Cemetery.

Partial filmography

 Señorita (1927) - Hernandez Gaucho (uncredited)
 The Ridin' Renegade (1928) - Little Wolf
 Two Fisted Justice (1931) - Henchman Cheyenne Charlie
 Law and Order (1932) - Mexican (uncredited)
 Scarface (1932) - Tony - Bodyguard (uncredited)
 The Mouthpiece (1932) - One of J.B.'s Henchmen (uncredited)
 Thunder Below (1932) - Messenger (uncredited)
 Tiger Shark (1932) - Crewman (uncredited)
 Trailing the Killer (1932) - Manuel
 The Barbarian (1933) - Dragoman (uncredited)
 Fighting Texans (1933) - Store Customer (uncredited)
 Flying Down to Rio (1933) - Waiter (uncredited)
 Viva Villa! (1934) - Tomás
 Grand Canary (1934) - Henchman (uncredited)
 West of the Pecos (1934) - Manuel
 Black Fury (1935) - Tony - a Miner (uncredited)
 Under the Pampas Moon (1935) - Jockey (uncredited)
 The Adventures of Rex and Rinty (1935, Serial) - Pasha [Chs. 1-4, 7-11]
 Sutter's Gold (1936) - De La Cruz (uncredited)
 Give Us This Night (1936) - Fisherman
 Robin Hood of El Dorado (1936) - Lookout Yelling 'Murrietta Comes!' (uncredited)
 The Traitor (1936) - Pedro Moreno
 Lady Luck (1936) - Head Barber (uncredited)
 Mummy's Boys (1936) - Fakir (uncredited)
 Waikiki Wedding (1937) - Cab Driver (uncredited)
 Midnight Taxi (1937) - Dazetta (uncredited)
 Behind the Headlines (1937) - (uncredited)
 Border Cafe (1937) - Mexican Policeman (uncredited)
 The Girl of the Golden West (1938) - Renegade in Prologue (uncredited)
 Tropic Holiday (1938) - Peón (uncredited)
 Juarez (1939) - Antonio Regales (uncredited)
 Only Angels Have Wings (1939) - Pancho
 Code of the Secret Service (1939) - Diego (uncredited)
 The Rains Came (1939) - Official (uncredited)
 Road to Singapore (1940) - Zato - Policeman (uncredited)
 They Drive by Night (1940) - Harry's Partner (uncredited)
 North West Mounted Police (1940) - Half-breed Archer (uncredited)
 Our Wife (1941) - Cuban Driver (uncredited)
 The Night of January 16th (1941) - Cuban Bartender (uncredited)
 Remember Pearl Harbor (1942) - Code Interpreter (uncredited)
 Perils of Nyoka (1942) - Ibrahim - Bedouin [Ch.1] (uncredited)
 Action in the North Atlantic (1943) - Greek Seaman (uncredited)
 For Whom the Bell Tolls (1943) - Soldier #3 (uncredited)
 Tiger Fangs (1943) - Takko
 Ali Baba and the Forty Thieves (1944) - Thief (uncredited)
 The Mask of Dimitrios (1944) - Turkish Morgue Attendant (uncredited)
 To Have and Have Not (1944) - Civilian (uncredited)
 The Conspirators (1944) - Fisherman (uncredited)
 The Picture of Dorian Gray (1945) - Barkeep (uncredited)
 South of the Rio Grande (1945) - Luis
 Perilous Holiday (1946) - Pedro (uncredited)
 Anna and the King of Siam (1946) - Guide (uncredited)
 California (1947) - Mexican Sheepherder (uncredited)
 The Homestretch (1947) - First Mate (uncredited)
 Trail of the Mounties (1947) - Trapper La Porte
 Secret Beyond the Door (1947) - Waiter (uncredited)
 French Leave (1948) - Seaman (uncredited)
 The Kissing Bandit (1948) - Esteban (uncredited)
 Mexican Hayride (1948) - Proprietor (uncredited)
 Viva Zapata! (1952) - Innocente (uncredited)
 Tonight We Sing (1953) - Greek (uncredited)
 Ride, Vaquero! (1953) - Comrade (uncredited)
 Killer Ape (1953) - Magi (uncredited)
 The Outsider (1961) - Mr. Sinta (uncredited)
 The Madmen of Mandoras (1963) - Presidente Juan Padua
 Alvarez Kelly (1966) - Mexican Manservant (uncredited)
 They Saved Hitler's Brain (1968) - Old Arab
 Justine (1969) -  Aged Man (uncredited)
 Flap (1970) - She'll-Be-Back-Pretty-Soon
 Angel Unchained (1970) - Injun

External links

 

1897 births
1974 deaths
20th-century American male actors
American male film actors
American male silent film actors
Burials at Hollywood Forever Cemetery
Greek emigrants to the United States